Ponti is a village on the island of Lefkada, in Greece. On November 17, 2015, a woman was killed after a 6.5 magnitude earthquake struck the region.

References

Lefkada